

Events

Pre-1600
 618 – Li Yuan becomes Emperor Gaozu of Tang, initiating three centuries of Tang dynasty rule over China.
 656 – Ali becomes Caliph of the Rashidun Caliphate.
 860 – Byzantine–Rus' War: A fleet of about 200 Rus' vessels sails into the Bosphorus and starts pillaging the suburbs of the Byzantine capital Constantinople.
1053 – Battle of Civitate: Three thousand Norman horsemen of Count Humphrey rout the troops of Pope Leo IX.
1178 – Five Canterbury monks see an event believed to have been the formation of the Giordano Bruno crater on the moon. It is believed that the current oscillations of the Moon's distance from the Earth (on the order of meters) are a result of this collision.
1264 – The Parliament of Ireland meets at Castledermot in County Kildare, the first definitively known meeting of this Irish legislature.
1265 – A draft Byzantine–Venetian treaty is concluded between Venetian envoys and Emperor Michael VIII Palaiologos, but is not ratified by Doge Reniero Zeno.
1429 – Charles VII's army defeats an English army under John Talbot at the Battle of Patay during the Hundred Years' War. The English lost 2,200 men, over half their army, crippling their efforts during this segment of the war.

1601–1900
1633 – Charles I is crowned King of Scots at St Giles' Cathedral, Edinburgh.
1684 – The charter of the Massachusetts Bay Colony is revoked via a scire facias writ issued by an English court.
1757 – Battle of Kolín between Prussian forces under Frederick the Great and an Austrian army under the command of Field Marshal Count Leopold Joseph von Daun in the Seven Years' War.
1778 – American Revolutionary War: The British Army abandons Philadelphia.
1799 – Action of 18 June 1799: A frigate squadron under Rear-admiral Jean-Baptiste Perrée is captured by the British fleet under Lord Keith.
1803 – Haitian Revolution: The Royal Navy led by Rear-Admiral John Thomas Duckworth commence the blockade of Saint-Domingue against French forces.
1812 – The United States declaration of war upon the United Kingdom is signed by President James Madison, beginning the War of 1812.
1815 – Napoleonic Wars: The Battle of Waterloo results in the defeat of Napoleon Bonaparte by the Duke of Wellington and Gebhard Leberecht von Blücher forcing him to abdicate the throne of France for the second and last time.
1822 – Konstantinos Kanaris blows up the Ottoman navy's flagship at Chios, killing the Kapudan Pasha Nasuhzade Ali Pasha.
1858 – Charles Darwin receives a paper from Alfred Russel Wallace that includes nearly identical conclusions about evolution as Darwin's own, prompting Darwin to publish his theory.
1859 – First ascent of Aletschhorn, second summit of the Bernese Alps.
1873 – Susan B. Anthony is fined $100 for attempting to vote in the 1872 presidential election.
1887 – The Reinsurance Treaty between Germany and Russia is signed.
1900 – Empress Dowager Cixi of China orders all foreigners killed, including foreign diplomats and their families.

1901–present
1908 – Japanese immigration to Brazil begins when 781 people arrive in Santos aboard the ship Kasato-Maru.
  1908   – The University of the Philippines is established.
1928 – Aviator Amelia Earhart becomes the first woman to fly in an aircraft across the Atlantic Ocean (she is a passenger; Wilmer Stultz is the pilot and Lou Gordon the mechanic).
1935 – Police in Vancouver, British Columbia, Canada, clash with striking longshoremen, resulting in a total of 60 injuries and 24 arrests.
1940 – Appeal of 18 June by Charles de Gaulle.
  1940   – The "Finest Hour" speech is delivered by Winston Churchill.
1945 – William Joyce ("Lord Haw-Haw") is charged with treason for his pro-German propaganda broadcasting during World War II.
1946 – Dr. Ram Manohar Lohia, a Socialist, calls for a Direct Action Day against the Portuguese in Goa.
1948 – Columbia Records introduces the long-playing record album in a public demonstration at the Waldorf-Astoria Hotel in New York City.
  1948   – Britain, France and the United States announce that on June 21, the Deutsche Mark will be introduced in western Germany and West Berlin. Over the next six days, Communists increasingly restrict access to Berlin.
1953 – The Egyptian revolution of 1952 ends with the overthrow of the Muhammad Ali dynasty and the declaration of the Republic of Egypt.
  1953   – A United States Air Force C-124 crashes and burns near Tachikawa, Japan, killing 129.
1954 – Carlos Castillo Armas leads an invasion force across the Guatemalan border, setting in motion the 1954 Guatemalan coup d'état.
 1958 – Benjamin Britten's one-act opera Noye's Fludde premiered at the Aldeburgh Festival.
1965 – Vietnam War: The United States Air Force uses B-52 bombers to attack guerrilla fighters in South Vietnam.
1972 – Staines air disaster: One hundred eighteen people are killed when a BEA H.S. Trident crashes minutes after takeoff from London's Heathrow Airport.
1979 – SALT II is signed by the United States and the Soviet Union.
1981 – The Lockheed F-117 Nighthawk, the first operational aircraft initially designed around stealth technology, makes its first flight.
1982 – Italian banker Roberto Calvi's body is discovered hanging beneath Blackfriars Bridge in London, England.
1983 – Space Shuttle program: STS-7, Astronaut Sally Ride becomes the first American woman in space.
  1983   – Mona Mahmudnizhad, together with nine other women of the Baháʼí Faith, is sentenced to death and hanged in Shiraz, Iran over her religious beliefs.
1984 – A major clash between about 5,000 police and a similar number of miners takes place at Orgreave, South Yorkshire, during the 1984–85 UK miners' strike.
1994 – The Troubles: Members of the Ulster Volunteer Force (UVF) attack a crowded pub with assault rifles in Loughinisland, Northern Ireland. Six Catholic civilians are killed and five wounded. It was crowded with people watching the 1994 FIFA World Cup.
1998 – Propair Flight 420 crashes near Montréal–Mirabel International Airport in Quebec, Canada, killing 11.
2006 – The first Kazakh space satellite, KazSat-1 is launched.
2007 – The Charleston Sofa Super Store fire happened in Charleston, South Carolina, killing nine firefighters.
2009 – The Lunar Reconnaissance Orbiter (LRO), a NASA robotic spacecraft is launched.
2018 – An earthquake of magnitude 6.1 strikes northern Osaka.

Births

Pre-1600
1269 – Eleanor of England, Countess of Bar (d. 1298)
1318 – Eleanor of Woodstock (d. 1355)
1332 – John V Palaiologos, Byzantine Emperor (d. 1391)
1466 – Ottaviano Petrucci, Italian printer (d. 1539)
1511 – Bartolomeo Ammannati, Italian architect and sculptor, designed the Ponte Santa Trinita (d. 1592)
1517 – Emperor Ōgimachi of Japan (d. 1593)
1521 – Maria of Portugal, Duchess of Viseu (d. 1577)

1601–1900
1667 – Ivan Trubetskoy, Russian field marshal (d. 1750)
1673 – Antonio de Literes, Spanish composer (d. 1747)
1677 – Antonio Maria Bononcini, Italian cellist and composer (d. 1726)
1716 – Joseph-Marie Vien, French painter and educator (d. 1809)
1717 – Johann Stamitz, Czech violinist and composer (d. 1757)
1757 – Ignaz Pleyel, Austrian-French pianist and composer (d. 1831)
  1757   – Gervasio Antonio de Posadas, Argentine lawyer and politician 1st Supreme Director of the United Provinces of the Río de la Plata (d. 1833)
1769 – Robert Stewart, Viscount Castlereagh, Irish-English politician, Secretary of State for Foreign and Commonwealth Affairs (d. 1822)
1799 – William Lassell, English astronomer and merchant (d. 1880)
1812 – Ivan Goncharov, Russian journalist and author (d. 1891)
1815 – Ludwig Freiherr von und zu der Tann-Rathsamhausen, German general (d. 1881)
1816 – Hélène Napoleone Bonaparte, French daughter of Napoleon (d. 1907)
  1816   – Jung Bahadur Rana, Nepali ruler (d. 1877)
1833 – Manuel González Flores, Mexican general and President (1880-1884) (d. 1893)
1834 – Auguste-Théodore-Paul de Broglie, French philosopher and academic (d. 1895)
1839 – William H. Seward Jr., American general and banker (d. 1920)
1845 – Charles Louis Alphonse Laveran, French physician and parasitologist, Nobel Prize laureate (d. 1922)
1850 – Richard Heuberger, Austrian composer and critic (d. 1914)
1854 – E. W. Scripps, American publisher, founded the E. W. Scripps Company (d. 1926)
1857 – Henry Clay Folger, American businessman and philanthropist, founded the Folger Shakespeare Library (d. 1930)
1858 – Andrew Forsyth, Scottish-English mathematician and academic (d. 1942)
  1858   – Hector Rason, English-Australian politician, 7th Premier of Western Australia (d. 1927)
1862 – Carolyn Wells, American novelist and poet (d. 1942)
1863 – George Essex Evans, English-Australian poet and author (d. 1909)
1868 – Miklós Horthy, Hungarian admiral and politician, Regent of Hungary (d. 1957)
1870 – Édouard Le Roy, French mathematician and philosopher (d. 1954)
1877 – James Montgomery Flagg, American painter and illustrator (d. 1960)
1881 – Zoltán Halmay, Hungarian swimmer (d. 1956)
1882 – Georgi Dimitrov, Bulgarian compositor and politician, 32nd Prime Minister of Bulgaria (d. 1949)
1884 – Édouard Daladier, French captain and politician, Prime Minister of France (d. 1970)
1886 – George Mallory, English lieutenant and mountaineer (d. 1924)
  1886   – Alexander Wetmore, American ornithologist and paleontologist (d. 1978)
1887 – Tancrède Labbé, Canadian businessman and politician (d. 1956)
1896 – Blanche Sweet, American actress (d. 1986)
1897 – Martti Marttelin, Finnish runner (d. 1940)
1900 – Vlasta Vraz, Czech-American relief worker, editor, and fundraiser (d. 1989)

1901–present
1901 – Grand Duchess Anastasia Nikolaevna of Russia (d. 1918)
  1901   – Llewellyn Rees, English actor (d. 1994)
1902 – Louis Alter, American musician (d. 1980)
  1902   – Paavo Yrjölä, Finnish decathlete (d. 1980)
1903 – Jeanette MacDonald, American actress and singer (d. 1965)
  1903   – Raymond Radiguet, French author and poet (d. 1923)
1904 – Keye Luke, Chinese-American actor (d. 1991)
  1904   – Manuel Rosenthal, French conductor and composer (d. 2003)
1905 – Eduard Tubin, Estonian composer and conductor (d. 1982)
1907 – Frithjof Schuon, Swiss-American metaphysicist, philosopher, and author (d. 1998)
1908 – Bud Collyer, American actor and game show host (d. 1969)
  1908   – Stanley Knowles, American-Canadian academic and politician (d. 1997)
  1908   – Nedra Volz, American actress (d. 2003)
1910 – Dick Foran, American actor and singer (d. 1979)
  1910   – Avon Long, American actor and singer (d. 1984)
  1910   – Ray McKinley, American singer, drummer, and bandleader (d. 1995)
1912 – Glenn Morris, American decathlete (d. 1974)
1913 – Wilfred Gordon Bigelow, Canadian soldier and surgeon (d. 2005)
  1913   – Sammy Cahn, American pianist and composer (d. 1993)
  1913   – Sylvia Porter, American economist and journalist (d. 1991)
  1913   – Françoise Loranger, Canadian playwright and producer (d. 1995)
  1913   – Robert Mondavi, American winemaker and philanthropist (d. 2008)
  1913   – Oswald Teichmüller, German mathematician (d. 1943)
1914 – E. G. Marshall, American actor (d. 1998)
  1914   – Efraín Huerta, Mexican poet (d.1982)
1915 – Red Adair, American firefighter (d. 2004)
  1915   – Robert Kanigher, American author (d. 2002)
  1915   – Alice T. Schafer, American mathematician (d. 2009)
1916 – Julio César Turbay Ayala, Colombian lawyer and politician, 25th President of Colombia (d. 2005)
1917 – Richard Boone, American actor, singer, and director (d. 1981)
  1917   – Jack Karnehm, English snooker player and sportscaster (d. 2002)
  1917   – Erik Ortvad, Danish painter and illustrator (d. 2008)
1918 – Alf Francis, West Prussia-born, English motor racing mechanic and race car constructor (d. 1983)
  1918   – Jerome Karle, American chemist and academic, Nobel Prize laureate (d. 2013)
  1918   – Franco Modigliani, Italian-American economist and academic, Nobel Prize laureate (d. 2003)
1919 – Jüri Järvet, Estonian actor and screenwriter (d. 1995)
1920 – Ian Carmichael, English actor and singer (d. 2010)
  1920   – Aster Berkhof, Belgian author and academic (d. 2020)
1922 – Claude Helffer, French pianist and educator (d. 2004)
1924 – George Mikan, American basketball player and coach (d. 2005)
1925 – Robert Beadell, American composer and educator (d. 1994)
1926 – Philip B. Crosby, American businessman and author (d. 2001)
  1926   – Allan Sandage, American astronomer and cosmologist (d. 2010)
  1926   – Tom Wicker, American journalist and author (d. 2011)
1927 – Eva Bartok, Hungarian-English actress (d. 1998)
  1927   – Paul Eddington, English actor (d. 1995)
1928 – Michael Blakemore, Australian actor, director, and screenwriter
  1928   – David T. Lykken, American geneticist and academic (d. 2006)
1929 – Jürgen Habermas, German sociologist and philosopher
  1929   – Tibor Rubin, Hungarian-American soldier, Medal of Honor recipient (d. 2015)
1931 – Fernando Henrique Cardoso, Brazilian sociologist, academic, and politician, 34th President of Brazil
1932 – Dudley R. Herschbach, American chemist and academic, Nobel Prize laureate
  1932   – Geoffrey Hill, English poet and academic (d. 2016)
1933 – Colin Brumby, Australian composer and conductor (d. 2018)
  1933   – Tommy Hunt, American singer
1934 – Brian Kenny, English general (d. 2017)
  1934   – Mitsuteru Yokoyama, Japanese author and illustrator (d. 2004)
  1934   – Barack Obama Sr., Kenyan economist (d. 1982)
1936 – Denny Hulme, New Zealand race car driver (d. 1992)
  1936   – Ronald Venetiaan, Surinamese politician, 6th President of Suriname
1937 – Del Harris, American basketball player and coach
  1937   – Jay Rockefeller, American lawyer and politician, 29th Governor of West Virginia
  1937   – Bruce Trigger, Canadian archaeologist, anthropologist and historian (d. 2006)
  1937   – Vitaly Zholobov, Ukrainian colonel, engineer, and astronaut
1938 – Kevin Murray, Australian footballer and coach
1939 – Lou Brock, American baseball player and sportscaster (d. 2020)
  1939   – Jean-Claude Germain, Canadian historian, author, and journalist
  1939   – Brooks Firestone, American businessman and politician
1941 – Roger Lemerre, French footballer and manager
  1941   – Paul Mayersberg, English director and screenwriter
  1941   – Delia Smith, English chef and author
1942 – John Bellany, Scottish painter (d. 2013)
  1942   – Roger Ebert, American journalist, critic, and screenwriter (d. 2013)
  1942   – Pat Hutchins, English author and illustrator (d. 2017)
  1942   – Thabo Mbeki, South African politician, 23rd President of South Africa
  1942   – Paul McCartney, English singer-songwriter and guitarist
  1942   – Richard Perry, American record producer
  1942   – Carl Radle, American bass player and producer (d. 1980)
  1942   – Nick Tate, Australian actor and director
  1942   – Hans Vonk, Dutch conductor (d. 2004)
1943 – Barry Evans, English actor (d. 1997)
  1943   – Raffaella Carrà, Italian singer, dancer, and actress (d. 2021)
  1943   – Éva Marton, Hungarian soprano and actress
1944 – Bruce DuMont, American broadcaster and political analyst
  1944   – Sandy Posey, American pop/country singer
1946 – Russell Ash, English journalist and author (d. 2010)
  1946   – Bruiser Brody, American wrestler (d. 1988)
  1946   – Fabio Capello, Italian footballer and manager
  1946   – Maria Bethânia, Brazilian singer
  1946   – Gordon Murray, British automobile designer
1947 – Ivonne Coll, Puerto Rican-American model and actress, Miss Puerto Rico 1967
  1947   – Bernard Giraudeau, French actor, director, producer, and screenwriter (d. 2010)
  1947   – Linda Thorson, Canadian actress
1948 – Philip Jackson, English actor
  1948   – Sherry Turkle, American academic, psychologist, and sociologist
1949 – Chris Van Allsburg, American author and illustrator
  1949   – Jarosław Kaczyński, Polish lawyer and politician, 13th Prime Minister of Poland
  1949   – Lech Kaczyński, Polish lawyer and politician, 4th President of Poland (d. 2010)
1950 – Rod de'Ath, Welsh drummer and producer (d. 2014)
  1950   – Annelie Ehrhardt, German hurdler
  1950   – Mike Johanns, American lawyer and politician, 28th United States Secretary of Agriculture
  1950   – Jackie Leven, Scottish singer-songwriter and guitarist (d. 2011)
1951 – Mohammed Al-Sager, Kuwaiti journalist and politician
  1951   – Miriam Flynn, American actress and comedian
  1951   – Ian Hargreaves, English-Welsh journalist and academic
  1951   – Stephen Hopper, Australian botanist and academic
  1951   – Gyula Sax, Hungarian chess player (d. 2014)
1952 – Tiiu Aro, Estonian physician and politician, Estonian Minister of Social Affairs
  1952   – Denis Herron, Canadian ice hockey player
  1952   – Carol Kane, American actress
  1952   – Isabella Rossellini, Italian actress, director, producer, and screenwriter
  1952   – Lee Soo-man, South Korean singer and businessman, founded S.M. Entertainment
1953 – Peter Donohoe, English pianist and educator
1955 – Ed Fast, Canadian lawyer and politician
1956 – Brian Benben, American actor and producer
  1956   – John Scott, English organist and conductor (d. 2015)
1957 – Miguel Ángel Lotina, Spanish footballer and manager
  1957   – Richard Powers, American novelist
1958 – Peter Altmaier, German jurist and politician, Federal Minister for Special Affairs of Germany
  1958   – Gary Martin, British voice actor and actor
1959 – Joe Ansolabehere, American animation screenwriter and producer
1960 – Barbara Broccoli, American director and producer
  1960   – Steve Murphy, Canadian journalist
1961 – Oz Fox, American singer-songwriter, guitarist, and producer
  1961   – Andrés Galarraga, Venezuelan-American baseball player
  1961   – Angela Johnson, American novelist and poet
  1961   – Alison Moyet, English singer-songwriter
1962 – Lisa Randall, American physicist and academic
1963 – Dizzy Reed, American keyboard player and songwriter
  1963   – Bruce Smith, American football player
1964 – Uday Hussein, Iraqi commander (d. 2003)
  1964   – Patti Webster, American publicist and author (d. 2013)
1966 – Kurt Browning, Canadian figure skater, choreographer, and sportscaster
  1966   – Troy Kemp, Bahamian high jumper
1968 – Frank Müller, German decathlete
1969 – Haki Doku, Albanian cyclist
  1969   – Christopher Largen, American journalist and author (d. 2012)
1970 – Katie Derham, English journalist
  1970   – Ivan Kozák, Slovak footballer
  1970   – Greg Yaitanes, American director and producer
1971 – Kerry Butler, American actress and singer
  1971   – Jason McAteer, English-Irish footballer and manager
  1971   – Nathan Morris, American soul singer
  1971   – Nigel Owens, Welsh rugby referee and TV presenter
1972 – Anu Tali, Estonian pianist and conductor
  1972   – Wikus du Toit, South African actor, director, and composer
1973 – Julie Depardieu, French actress
  1973   – Stephen Thomas Erlewine, American author and music critic
  1973   – Ray LaMontagne, American singer-songwriter and guitarist
  1973   – Alexandra Meissnitzer, Austrian skier
  1973   – Matt Parsons, Australian rugby league player
  1973   – Gavin Wanganeen Australian footballer and coach
1974 – Vincenzo Montella, Italian footballer and manager
  1974   – Sergey Sharikov, Russian fencer and coach (d. 2015)
1975 – Marie Gillain, Belgian actress
  1975   – Aleksandrs Koliņko, Latvian footballer
  1975   – Martin St. Louis, Canadian ice hockey player
1976 – Blake Shelton, American singer-songwriter and guitarist
1978 – Wang Liqin, Chinese table tennis player
1979 – Yumiko Kobayashi, Japanese voice actress and singer
  1979   – Ivana Wong, Hong Kong singer-songwriter and actress
1980 – Antonio Gates, American football player
  1980   – Sergey Kirdyapkin, Russian race walker
  1980   – Craig Mottram, Australian runner
  1980   – Antero Niittymäki, Finnish ice hockey player
  1980   – Tara Platt, American actress, producer, and screenwriter
1981 – Clint Newton, American-Australian rugby league player
  1981   – Marco Streller, Swiss footballer
1982 – Nadir Belhadj, French-Algerian footballer
  1982   – Marco Borriello, Italian footballer
  1982   – Nathan Cavaleri, Australian singer-songwriter, guitarist, and actor
1983 – Billy Slater, Australian rugby league player
  1983   – Cameron Smith, Australian rugby league player
1984 – Nanyak Dala, Canadian rugby player
1985 – Chris Coghlan, American baseball player
  1985   – Alex Hirsch, American animator and television producer
1986 – Edgars Eriņš, Latvian decathlete
  1986   – Richard Gasquet, French tennis player
1987 – Omar Arellano, Mexican footballer
  1987   – Moeen Ali, English cricketer
1988 – Elini Dimoutsos, Greek footballer
  1988   – Josh Dun, American musician
1989 – Pierre-Emerick Aubameyang, French-born Gabonese footballer
  1989   – Chris Harris Jr., American football player
1990 – Luke Adam, Canadian ice hockey player
  1990   – Sandra Izbașa, Romanian gymnast
  1990   – Derek Stepan, American ice hockey player
  1990   – Christian Taylor, American triple jumper
1993 – Dennis Lloyd, Israeli musician, producer, singer, songwriter, and multi-instrumentalist
1994 – Sean McMahon, Australian rugby player
  1994   – Takeoff, American rapper (d. 2022)
1995 – Maxim Kovtun, Russian figure skater
1996 – Alen Halilović, Croatian footballer
  1996   – Niki Wories, Dutch figure skater
1997 – Katharina Hobgarski, German tennis player
  1997   – Latrell Mitchell, Australian rugby league player
  1999 – Choi Ye-won, South Korean singer and actress
1999   – Trippie Redd, American rapper

Deaths

Pre-1600
 741 – Leo III the Isaurian, Byzantine emperor (b. 685)
 908 – Zhang Hao, general of Yang Wu
1095 – Sophia of Hungary (b. c. 1050)
1164 – Elisabeth of Schönau, German Benedictine visionary (b. c. 1129)
1234 – Emperor Chūkyō of Japan (b. 1218)
1250 – Theresa of Portugal, Queen of León
1291 – Alfonso III of Aragon (b. 1265)
1333 – Henry XV, Duke of Bavaria (b. 1312)
1464 – Rogier van der Weyden, Flemish painter (b. 1400)
1588 – Robert Crowley, English minister and poet (b. 1517)

1601–1900
1629 – Piet Pieterszoon Hein, Dutch admiral (b. 1577)
1650 – Christoph Scheiner, German priest, physicist, and astronomer (b. 1575)
1673 – Jeanne Mance, French-Canadian nurse, founded the Hôtel-Dieu de Montréal (b. 1606)
1704 – Tom Brown, English author and translator (b. 1662)
1726 – Michel Richard Delalande, French organist and composer (b. 1657)
1742 – John Aislabie, English politician, Chancellor of the Exchequer (b. 1670)
1749 – Ambrose Philips, English poet and politician (b. 1674)
1772 – Johann Ulrich von Cramer, German jurist and scholar (b. 1706)
  1772   – Gerard van Swieten, Dutch-Austrian physician and reformer (b. 1700)
1788 – Adam Gib, Scottish religious leader (b. 1714)
1794 – François Buzot, French lawyer and politician (b. 1760)
  1794   – James Murray, Scottish-English general and politician, 20th Governor of the Province of Quebec (b. 1721)
1804 – Maria Amalia, Duchess of Parma (b. 1746)
1815 – Thomas Picton, Welsh-English general and politician (b. 1758)
1833 – Robert Hett Chapman, American minister, missionary, and academic (b. 1771)
1835 – William Cobbett, English farmer and journalist (b. 1763)
1860 – Friedrich Wilhelm von Bismarck, German army officer and writer (b. 1783)
1866 – Prince Sigismund of Prussia (b. 1864)

1901–present
1902 – Samuel Butler, English novelist, satirist, and critic (b. 1835)
1905 – Carmine Crocco, Italian soldier (b. 1830)
1916 – Max Immelmann, German lieutenant and pilot (b. 1890)
1917 – Titu Maiorescu, Romanian critic and politician, 23rd Prime Minister of Romania (b. 1840)
1921 – Abdul Awwal Jaunpuri, Indian Islamic scholar and author (b. 1867)
1922 – Jacobus Kapteyn, Dutch astronomer and academic (b. 1851)
1926 – Olga Constantinovna of Russia, Queen consort of the Hellenes (b. 1851)
1928 – Roald Amundsen, Norwegian pilot and explorer (b. 1872)
1936 – Maxim Gorky, Russian novelist, short story writer, and playwright (b. 1868)
1937 – Gaston Doumergue, French politician, 13th President of France (b. 1863)
1942 – Arthur Pryor, American trombonist, bandleader, and politician (b. 1870)
1943 – Elias Degiannis, Greek commander (b. 1912)
1945 – Florence Bascom, American geologist and educator (b. 1862)
  1945   – Simon Bolivar Buckner Jr., American general (b. 1886)
1947 – Shigematsu Sakaibara, Japanese admiral (b. 1898)
1948 – Edward Brooker, English-Australian politician, 31st Premier of Tasmania (b. 1891)
1959 – Ethel Barrymore, American actress (b. 1879)
1963 – Pedro Armendáriz, Mexican-American actor (b. 1912)
1964 – Giorgio Morandi, Italian painter (b. 1890)
1967 – Geki, Italian race car driver (b. 1937)
  1967   – Beat Fehr, Swiss race car driver (b. 1942)
1971 – Thomas Gomez, American actor (b. 1905)
  1971   – Paul Karrer, Russian-Swiss chemist and academic, Nobel Prize laureate (b. 1889)
1974 – Júlio César de Mello e Souza, Brazilian mathematician and academic (b. 1896)
  1974   – Georgy Zhukov, Russian marshal and politician, Minister of Defence for the Soviet Union (b. 1896)
1975 – Hugo Bergmann, German-Israeli philosopher and author (b. 1883)
1978 – Walter C. Alvarez, American physician and author (b. 1884)
1980 – Terence Fisher, English director and screenwriter (b. 1904)
  1980   – André Leducq, French cyclist (b. 1904)
1982 – Djuna Barnes, American novelist, journalist, and playwright (b. 1892)
  1982   – John Cheever, American novelist and short story writer (b. 1912)
  1982   – Curd Jürgens, German-Austrian actor and director (b. 1915)
1984 – Alan Berg, American lawyer and radio host (b. 1934)
1985 – Paul Colin, French illustrator (b. 1892)
1986 – Frances Scott Fitzgerald, American journalist (b. 1921)
1989 – I. F. Stone, American journalist and author (b. 1907)
1992 – Kofoworola Abeni Pratt, the first black Chief Nursing Officer of Nigeria (b. 1910)
  1992   – Peter Allen, Australian singer-songwriter and pianist (b. 1944)
  1992   – Mordecai Ardon, Polish-Israeli painter and educator (b. 1896)
1993 – Craig Rodwell, American activist, founded the Oscar Wilde Bookshop (b. 1940)
1996 – Endel Puusepp, Estonian-Soviet military pilot and politician (b. 1909)
1997 – Lev Kopelev, Ukrainian-German author and academic (b. 1912)
1998 – Felix Knight, American actor and tenor (b. 1908)
2000 – Nancy Marchand, American actress (b. 1928)
2003 – Larry Doby, American baseball player and manager (b. 1923)
2005 – Mushtaq Ali, Indian cricketer (b. 1914)
  2005   – Manuel Sadosky, Argentinian mathematician and academic (b. 1914)
2006 – Vincent Sherman, American actor, director, and screenwriter (b. 1906)
  2006   – Joseph Zobel, Martinique-French author (b. 1915)
2007 – Bernard Manning, English comedian and actor (b. 1930)
  2007   – Hank Medress, American singer and producer (b. 1938)
  2007   – Georges Thurston, Canadian singer-songwriter (b. 1951)
2008 – Jean Delannoy, French actor, director, and screenwriter (b. 1908)
  2008   – Tasha Tudor, American author and illustrator (b. 1915)
  2008   – Hans Steinbrenner, German sculptor (b. 1928)
2010 – Trent Acid, American wrestler (b. 1980)
  2010   – José Saramago, Portuguese novelist Nobel Prize laureate (b. 1922)
  2010   – Okan Demiriş, Turkish composer (b. 1942)
2011 – Yelena Bonner, Russian activist (b. 1923)
  2011   – Frederick Chiluba, Zambian politician, 2nd President of Zambia (b. 1943)
  2011   – Clarence Clemons, American saxophonist (b. 1942)
2012 – Horacio Coppola, Argentinian photographer and director (b. 1906)
  2012   – Lina Haag, German author and activist (b. 1907)
  2012   – Tom Maynard, Welsh cricketer (b. 1989)
  2012   – Luis Edgardo Mercado Jarrín, Peruvian general and politician, 109th Prime Minister of Peru (b. 1919)
  2012   – Alketas Panagoulias, Greek footballer and manager (b. 1934)
  2012   – William Van Regenmorter, American businessman and politician (b. 1939)
2013 – Brent F. Anderson, American engineer and politician (b. 1932)
  2013   – Alastair Donaldson, Scottish bass player (b. 1955)
  2013   – Garde Gardom, Canadian lawyer and politician, 26th Lieutenant Governor of British Columbia (b. 1924)
  2013   – Michael Hastings, American journalist and author (b. 1980)
  2013   – David Wall, English ballet dancer (b. 1946)
2014 – Stephanie Kwolek, American chemist and engineer (b. 1923)
  2014   – Johnny Mann, American singer-songwriter and conductor (b. 1928)
  2014   – Claire Martin, Canadian author (b. 1914)
  2014   – Vladimir Popovkin, Russian general (b. 1957)
  2014   – Horace Silver, American pianist and composer (b. 1928)
2015 – Phil Austin, American comedian, actor, and screenwriter (b. 1941)
  2015   – Ralph J. Roberts, American businessman, co-founded Comcast (b. 1920)
  2015   – Danny Villanueva, American football player and broadcaster, co-founded Univision (b. 1937)
  2015   – Allen Weinstein, American historian and academic (b. 1937)
2016 – Jeppiaar, Indian educationist, founder and chancellor of Sathyabama University (b. 1931)
2018 – XXXTentacion, American rapper (b. 1998)
  2018   – Big Van Vader (also known as Vader) American professional wrestler (b. 1955)
  2018   – Jimmy Wopo, American rapper (b. 1997)
2020 – Vera Lynn, English singer who was the "Forces' Sweetheart" in World War II (b. 1917)
2022 – Uffe Ellemann-Jensen, Danish politician, minister of foreign affairs (b. 1941)
  2022   – Adibah Noor, Malaysian actress, singer, master of ceremonies (b. 1970)

Holidays and observances
 Autistic Pride Day (International)
 Christian feast day:
 Bernard Mizeki (Anglican and Episcopal Church)
 Elisabeth of Schönau
 Gregorio Barbarigo
 Leontius, Hypatius and Theodulus
 Marina the Monk (Maronite Church, Coptic Orthodox Church of Alexandria)
 Mark and Marcellian
 June 18 (Eastern Orthodox liturgics)
 Foundation Day (Benguet)
 Human Rights Day (Azerbaijan)
 National Day (Seychelles)
 Queen Mother's Birthday (Cambodia)
 Waterloo Day (United Kingdom)

References

External links

 
 
 

Days of the year
June